Macrogomphus annulatus, commonly known as Keiser's forktail, is a species of dragonfly in the family Gomphidae. It is native to India and Sri Lanka. Two subspecies are recognized, which are geographically separated.

Subspecies
 Macrogomphus annulatus annulatus Selys, 1854 – from India
 Macrogomphus annulatus keiseri Lieftinck, 1955 – from Sri Lanka

See also 
 List of odonates of Sri Lanka
 List of odonates of India

References

 Animal diversity web
 IUCN Red List
 Query Results

Gomphidae
Insects described in 1854
Taxa named by Edmond de Sélys Longchamps